Euprepiophis conspicillata, commonly known as the Japanese forest rat snake, is a species of nonvenomous colubrid snake endemic to Japan. Its Japanese common name, jimuguri, roughly translates to "the burrower".  It is closely related to Euprepiophis mandarinus, the Mandarin rat snake.

Geographic range
Euprepiophis conspicillata is native to all four main islands of Japan, including some smaller outlying islands, as well as Kunashir Island (territory disputed between Japan and Russia).

Description
Adults are usually  in total length (body + tail).

Taxonomy
In recent years there has been some taxonomic controversy over the genera of rat snakes.  Based on mitochondrial DNA, Utiger et al. (2002) argued for a splintering of the genus Elaphe and suggested a reworking of the genera.

However, all published taxonomy remains a taxonomic suggestion until ruled on by the International Commission on Zoological Nomenclature (ICZN - http://www.iczn.org/), but that body has so far not supported the change and has not addressed the taxonomic suggestion. Thus the official taxonomy remains Elaphe.

Natural history
The Japanese forest rat snake can be found surface active at any hour, but they most often show crepuscular activity patterns.  It may completely cease surface activity from mid-late summer when conditions become too hot and/or dry.  Principal prey items are small rodents, and the snakes often use the rodent burrows for shelter.

As the Japanese common name suggests, this species is fossorial, and is normally associated with forested areas.  Occurs from sea level to at least .

References

Further reading
Boie, H. 1826. Merkmale eineger japanischer Lurche. Isis von Oken 19: 203–216. (Coluber conspicillatus, p. 211.)
Duméril, A.M.C.; G. Bibron; and A.H.A. Duméril. 1854. Erpétologie générale ou histoire naturelle complète des reptiles. Tome septième. Première partie. Comprenant l'histoire des serpents non venimeux. Paris: Roret. xvi + 780 pp. (Elaphis conspicillatus, pp. 285–288.)
Stejneger, L. 1907. Herpetology of Japan and Adjacent Territory. United States National Museum Bulletin 58. Washington, District of Columbia: Smithsonian Institution. xx + 577 pp. (Elaphe conspicillata, pp. 334–337, Figures 284–286.)

External links
Info Page

Rat snakes
Colubrids
Reptiles of Japan
Taxa named by Heinrich Boie
Reptiles described in 1826